Dave Tretowicz (born March 15, 1969) is an American former professional ice hockey player. In 1988, he was drafted in the NHL by the Calgary Flames. He competed in the men's tournament at the 1992 Winter Olympics.

Biography
Tretowicz was born in Pittsfield, Massachusetts in 1969. He grew up in Liverpool, New York and began skating at the age of five. He attended Liverpool High School in New York, and was one of the best skaters in the Central New York area. Tretowicz made the US national junior team at the age of 16, and a year later, he was selected to the national team. He then went to Clarkson University, and was named to the ECAC all-rookie team in the 1987/88 season. This was followed by him being drafted by the Calgary Flames in the National Hockey League.

In 1991, Tretowicz was part of the US national team that played at the Men's Ice Hockey World Championships. Tretowicz was part of the American team that took part in the men's tournament at the 1992 Winter Olympics in Albertville, France. He also played in the International Hockey League for the Phoenix Roadrunners and the Fort Wayne Komets in the early 1990s.

After his playing career, Tretowicz worked for the Crouse-Hinds Company. In 2019, he was inducted into the NYS High School Hockey Association Hall of Fame. Tretowicz was also the first hockey player to be inducted into the Greater Syracuse Sports Hall of Fame. His son, Adam, also plays ice hockey.

Career statistics

Regular season and playoffs

International

References

External links
 

1969 births
Living people
American men's ice hockey players
Olympic ice hockey players of the United States
Ice hockey players at the 1992 Winter Olympics
Sportspeople from Pittsfield, Massachusetts
Clarkson Golden Knights men's ice hockey players
Fort Wayne Komets players
Phoenix Roadrunners (IHL) players
Calgary Flames draft picks
Ice hockey players from Massachusetts
Liverpool High School alumni